Salman is a town in Akkuş district of Ordu Province, Turkey. At  it is situated in the mountainous area of Black Sea Region. The population of Salman was 2931 as of 2011. According to town page, Salman was founded by Chepni people, a Turkmen tribe. It was named after Selman Pasha who was a commander of Danishmends (11-12th century)  After the disintegration of Seljuks of Turkey, the area around the settlement was captured by the beylik (principality) of Hacıemiroğulları (see Beyliks of Canik).  But in the 15th century it was incorporated into Ottoman realm. In 1989 it was declared a seat of township. The town is surrounded by forests . In the limited agricultural land hazelnut, corn and kale are among the main crops. Beehiving and carpet weaving are other economic activities.

References

External links
For Images

Populated places in Ordu Province
Towns in Turkey
Akkuş District